Age 7 in America is a 1991 American documentary film produced by Michael Apted, co-produced by Vicky Bippart, directed by Phil Joanou, and narrated by Meryl Streep. It details the lives of 7-year-old Americans from across the continental United States, of varying social classes and ethnicities. Patterned after the Up series of the United Kingdom, Age 7 in America has been succeeded by the films 14 Up in America (1998), also directed by Joanou and produced by Vicky Bippart, and 21 Up in America (2006), directed by Christopher Dillon Quinn and produced by Vicky Bippart.

The Children
 Luis lives in New York City's Lower East Side. He lives in a homeless shelter. His mother is a drug addict.
 Lucy, Alexis, and Kate live in New York City's Upper East Side and attend the prestigious Nightingale-Bamford School.
 Ashtyn lives in a middle-class suburban neighborhood in Lincoln, Nebraska.
 LeRoy lives in an apartment building (part of the Robert Taylor housing project) in the South Side of Chicago. He is African American.
 Kennisha is LeRoy's classmate and has lived in the housing project for the first part of her life but moved away later. She is also African American.
 Douglas, Vicky, and Mike live in a traditionally working-class, Polish community in Chicago. They attend a private Catholic school.
 Eric lives in a wealthy Chicago suburb. He is an only child. He eventually starts his own company.
 Brandon lives in a wealthy suburb and is a classmate and friend of Eric. They both go to a prep school on the University of Chicago's campus.
 Joey lives in rural Georgia and is a Jehovah's Witness.
 Edie lives near Joey and is African American.
 Salina lives in Los Angeles and is the daughter of Chinese and Vietnamese immigrants.
 Julio came to Los Angeles from El Salvador and lives in a Spanish-speaking household.
 Michael lives in a beachside community of Los Angeles.

References

External links

1991 television films
1991 films
1991 documentary films
American documentary films
Documentary films about children
Documentary films about the United States
1990s English-language films
Films directed by Phil Joanou
1990s American films